Alfred Edgar Hunt (2 May 1861 – 16 August 1930) was an Australian politician and a member of the New South Wales Legislative Council for 13 years.

Early life
Hunt was born in Dural, New South Wales, the son of George Thomas Hunt, orchardist, and Elizabeth Williams. He attended Newington College whilst the school was situated at Newington House on the Parramatta River.

Career
After school he selected land in the sheep district of Bogan Shire. He then owned Wyoming Station at Nevertire, New South Wales. In 1912 he became an executive member of the Farmers and Settlers Association, serving as president from 1921 until 1922 and vice-president from 1922 until 1925. For six years he was a member of the State Wool Committee and was elected president of the Australian Farmers Federal Organisation in 1930. He was president of New Settlers League from 1929 until 1930. He worked for the Far West Children's Health Scheme as honorary treasurer. Hunt was an active member of Methodist Church of Australasia serving on both NSW and Australian Conferences.

References

1861 births
1930 deaths
Members of the New South Wales Legislative Council
People educated at Newington College
National Party of Australia members of the Parliament of New South Wales